Radoslav Marinov Velikov (born 2 September 1983 in Kutsina, Veliko Tarnovo Province) is a Bulgarian freestyle wrestler. He has been engaged in wrestling since 1997 and he currently competes for Levski Sofia, where his coach is former world champion and triple European champion Simeon Shterev, who also used to coach Stanka Zlateva. Velikov won the 2006 World Championships in Guangzhou and came second in 2005 in Budapest. He came second at the European Championships in Varna in 2005 and third in Europe in Sofia in 2007. At the 2004 Summer Olympics in Athens he came ninth.

At the 2008 Summer Olympics in Beijing, he won bronze in his category (55 kilograms).  Velikov clinched the Bronze medal in Beijing despite a serious injury of his left knee immediately before the tournament which put his participation in doubt. He nevertheless took part in the Olympics thanks to painkillers.

He missed out on another bronze medal at the 2012 Summer Olympics, losing to Shinichi Yumoto in his bronze medal match.

References

External links
 

Living people
1983 births
Bulgarian male sport wrestlers
Olympic wrestlers of Bulgaria
Wrestlers at the 2004 Summer Olympics
Wrestlers at the 2008 Summer Olympics
Wrestlers at the 2012 Summer Olympics
Olympic bronze medalists for Bulgaria
Olympic medalists in wrestling
Medalists at the 2008 Summer Olympics
European Games competitors for Bulgaria
Wrestlers at the 2015 European Games
World Wrestling Championships medalists
Sportspeople from Veliko Tarnovo Province
20th-century Bulgarian people
21st-century Bulgarian people
World Wrestling Champions